Gemini is the debut studio album by experimental Filipino rock band Project Moonman. The album consists of thirteen original tracks. It was released in 2021 by O/C Records.

Background
Project Moonman started out as a solo project by DJ and songwriter Mark Thompson, and then he met the other members and started forming a band. 

The band then announced that they will be releasing an album because "They can" and "They wanted to."

Track listing
13 songs were written by Mark Thompson and Owen Greyson.

Personnel
Mark Thompson – producer, songwriter, vocalist
Owen Greyson – songwriter, vocalist
Nick Gotinga – lead guitarist
Alden Acosta – bass guitarist
Lukas Samuel – drums
Arden Formento – dj

References

External links

2021 debut albums